Guanahacabibes is a word of Taíno origin, and may refer to:

Places
Guanahacabibes Peninsula, a peninsula in the western extremity of Cuba
Gulf of Guanahacabibes, a gulf north of the peninsula
Guanahacabibes Biosphere Reserve, a protected area on the peninsula

Species
Eleutherodactylus guanahacabibes, a species of frog in the family Eleutherodactylidae, named for the Guanahacabibes Peninsula
Guanahacabibes dwarf boa (Tropidophis xanthogaster), a species of snake endemic to the Guanahacabibes Peninsula